The 1962 Formula One season was the 16th season of FIA Formula One motor racing. It featured the 1962 World Championship of Drivers and the 1962 International Cup for F1 Manufacturers which were contested concurrently over a nine race series that commenced on 20 May and ended on 29 December. The season also included a number of non-championship races for Formula One cars.

Season summary
Ferrari were completely eclipsed in 1962, partly as a result of internal upheavals, partly because the British teams had made great progress. BRM finally came up well with Graham Hill taking the championship after a season-long battle with the revolutionary monocoque Lotus 25 driven by Jim Clark. Dan Gurney gave Porsche their only Grand Prix win at Rouen, and Cooper won their last race until 1966. Lola made the first of their sporadic forays into Grand Prix racing, and Jack Brabham emerged as a constructor, scoring his first points in his own car. Stirling Moss, widely considered to be the greatest driver to never win the championship and one of the greatest drivers in motorsport, was due to drive for Ferrari this season however he crashed heavily in an off-season race at Goodwood and never raced in Formula One again. Ricardo Rodríguez, age 20 years 123 days, became the youngest driver to score championship points with his fourth place in Belgium, a record which stood for 38 years until Jenson Button, aged 20 years 67 days, broke it at the 2000 Brazilian Grand Prix.

Two drivers were to die during this season. Mexican Ricardo Rodríguez during the non-championship Mexican Grand Prix at the Mixhuca circuit, and noted Rhodesian motorcycle rider Gary Hocking during the non-championship Natal Grand Prix at the Westmead Circuit in South Africa. Ferrari started the year well, with Phil Hill in second place after having been on the podium in the first three races. However, personality differences, the loss of most of the engineering team in the 1961 "walk-out" and a prolonged industrial strike led to Enzo Ferrari withdrawing his team from the last two races.

Season review

Teams and drivers

The following teams and drivers competed in the 1962 FIA World Championship. All teams competed with tyres supplied by Dunlop.

World Drivers' Championship standings

Points towards the 1962 World Championship of Drivers were awarded on a 9–6–4–3–2–1 basis to the first six finishers in each race, with the best five race results retained by each driver.

 Only the best 5 results counted towards the championship. Numbers without parentheses are championship points; numbers in parentheses are total points scored.
 Italics indicate fastest lap 
 Bold indicates pole position

International Cup for F1 Manufacturers standings
Points towards the 1962 International Cup for F1 Manufacturers were awarded on a 9–6–4–3–2–1 basis for the first six places in each race, however only the best placed car from each manufacturer was eligible to score points and only the best five results could be retained by each manufacturer.

 Only the best five results counted towards the championship. Numbers without parentheses are championship points; numbers in parentheses are total points scored.
Bold results counted to championship totals.

Non-championship races
The following Formula One races which did not count towards the World Championship of Drivers or the International Cup for F1 Manufacturers, were also held in 1962.

Notes

References

External links
 1962 F1 Results & image galleries at www.f1-facts.com
 1962 FIA Regulations at www.sovren.org (archived)

 
Formula One seasons